Jack Starr (born 1951) is an American heavy metal and blues guitarist and songwriter, born of a French mother and American father.

Biography
He learned to play guitar by ear, copying the riffs of R&B records. His first semi-professional band was Les Variations in France with future members of Trust. In the U.S. Starr emerged on the rock and metal scene in 1981, forming, together with Joey Ayvazian, David DeFeis and Joe O’Rielly, the first incarnation of the heavy metal band Virgin Steele. The new band was selected in 1982 by Mike Varney of Shrapnel Records to appear on the label's compilation album U.S. Metal Volume 2. The song Starr sent in for the compilation was "Children of the Storm". After only two albums, Virgin Steele of 1981 and Guardians of the Flame of 1982, Starr left Virgin Steele in 1983 because of musical differences with the band's front man and other main songwriter David DeFeis.

In 1984, Starr started his solo recording career with the album Out of the Darkness, featuring former Riot vocalist Rhett Forrester, members of The Rods and former Rainbow drummer Gary Driscoll. It was released in Europe by Music for Nations and was picked as one of the best albums of the year by the music magazines Kerrang! and Metal Forces.

Starr changed the name of his band to Jack Starr's Burning Starr and between 1984 and 1989 he produced albums, both solo and with the band. The music of those albums was classic American eighties heavy metal, a style between Poison and Metallica. In 1989 the band dissolved and Starr joined short-lived bands like Strider and Smoke Stack Lightning.

After a break, in 2003, Starr founded a new band called Guardians of the Flame, which released only one album, Under a Savage Sky.

In 2006, Starr founded the Jack Starr Blues Band.

In the following years, Starr once again assembled a group of musicians for a new incarnation of Burning Starr, which performed at the Magic Circle Festival 2008 and released the album Defiance on the Manowar's label Magic Circle Music in 2009. In 2011 they released Land of the Dead with Limb Music. The albums includes ex-Manowar guest musicians Ross the Boss and David Shankle. The band played at the 2013 Keep It True festival and recorded a DVD.

Discography

Solo albums
Out of the Darkness (1984)
A Minor Disturbance (1990)
Soon Day Will Come (2000)
Before the Steele: Roots of a Metal Master (2001) (compilation)
Swimming in Dirty Water (2011)

Virgin Steele
Demo (1982)
Virgin Steele (1982)
Guardians of the Flame (1983)
Wait for the Night EP (1983)

Devil Childe
Devil Childe (1984)
Phantom Lord (1985)

Burning Starr
 Rock the American Way (1985)
 No Turning Back (1986)
 Blaze of Glory (1987)
 Jack Starr's Burning Starr (1989)
Burning Starr (compilation) (1998)
 Defiance (2009)
 Land of the Dead (2011)
 Stand Your Ground (2017)
  Souls of the Innocent (2022)

Phantom Lord
Phantom Lord (1985)	
PHANTOM LORD -"Evil Never Sleeps "(1986)

Thrasher
Burning at the Speed of Light (1985)

Strider
Strider (1991)

Guardians of the Flame
Under a Savage Sky (2003)

Jack Starr Blues Band
Take It to the Bank (2008)

References

External links
Jack Starr's Burning Starr official site

American heavy metal guitarists
Lead guitarists
Musicians from Paris
Living people
1950 births
Guitarists from New York (state)
American male guitarists
20th-century American guitarists
20th-century American male musicians
Music for Nations artists